Jim Stamas (born February 17, 1965) is a member of the Michigan State Senate and former Majority Floor Leader of the Michigan House of Representatives. He was inaugurated in the Michigan Senate on January 1, 2015. A Republican, he represents District 36 in the Senate and represented District 98 in the House, and is from Midland.

Political career
State Representative Jim Stamas was elected to his second term in the Michigan House of Representatives in November 2010, representing portions of Midland and Saginaw counties. Stamas is a former two-term Midland County commissioner. He was a Midland Township trustee from 1997 to 2004. He served on the boards of the Midland Downtown Development Authority, Midland Downtown Business Association, and Midland County Planning Commission.

On June 14, 2012, Stamas moved with the House Representative leadership to bar two fellow Representatives from speaking on the floor. One, Representative Lisa Brown (D - West Bloomfield) was denied speaking time after, during a debate regarding a restrictive anti-abortion bill, she made the remarks, "...Mr Speaker, I'm flattered that you're all so interested in my vagina, but 'no' means 'no.'"  According to Ari Adler, spokesman for the Republican Majority, "Majority Floor Leader Jim Stamas determined Brown's comments violated the decorum of the House." Michigan State Representative Barb Byrum (D - Onondaga) was also barred June 14 from introducing an amendment to the same proposed anti-abortion bill that would ban men from receiving vasectomy procedures unless sterilization were necessary to save a man's life.

Personal life
Stamas is the owner and former general manager of Pizza Sam's, the eatery in Midland the Stamas family has owned for nearly 50 years. Prior to running the family business, Stamas was self-employed as a realtor and was project manager at Case Systems.  Stamas holds a bachelor's degree in business administration from Northwood University and an associate degree in business management from Delta College.  Stamas served in both the U.S. Army and the Michigan National Guard. Jim and wife, Marsha, have been married for more than 35 years, and have a daughter, an up-and-coming comedian in Chicago, and a son.

His brother, Tony Stamas, served in the state House and Senate.

References
https://www.npr.org/blogs/thetwo-way/2012/06/14/155059849/michigan-state-rep-barred-from-speaking-after-vagina-comments?sc=fb&cc=fp

External links
 Stamas at gophouse.org

Living people
Republican Party members of the Michigan House of Representatives
People from Midland, Michigan
Delta College (Michigan) alumni
Northwood University alumni
1965 births
Republican Party Michigan state senators
21st-century American politicians
United States Army soldiers